Louise Michel (29 May 1830 – 9 January 1905) was a teacher and important figure in the Paris Commune. Following her penal transportation to New Caledonia she embraced anarchism. When returning to France she emerged as an important French anarchist and went on speaking tours across Europe. The journalist Brian Doherty has called her the "French grande dame of anarchy." Her use of a black flag at a demonstration in Paris in March 1883 was also the earliest known of what would become known as the anarchy black flag.

Early life
Louise Michel was born on 29 May 1830 as the illegitimate daughter of a serving-maid, Marianne Michel, and the son of the house, Laurent Demahis. She was raised by her paternal grandparents, Charlotte and Charles-Étienne Demahis, in north-eastern France. She spent her childhood in the Château de Vroncourt and was provided with a liberal education. When her grandparents died, she completed teacher training and worked in villages.

Career and activism 
In 1865 Michel opened a school in Paris which became known for its modern and progressive methods. Michel corresponded with the prominent French romanticist Victor Hugo and began publishing poetry. She became involved in the radical politics of Paris and among her associates were Auguste Blanqui, Jules Vallès and Théophile Ferré. In 1869 the feminist group Société pour la Revendication des Droits Civils de la Femme (Society for the Demand of Civil Rights for Women) was announced by André Léo. Among the members of the group were Michel, Paule Minck, Eliska Vincent, Élie Reclus and his wife Noémie, Mme Jules Simon, Caroline de Barrau and Maria Deraismes. Because of the broad range of opinions, the group decided to focus on the subject of improving girls' education.

Commonly known as the Revendication des Droits de la Femme (Demand for Women's Rights), the group had close ties with the Société Coopérative des Ouvriers et Ouvrières (Cooperative Society of Men and Women Workers). The July 1869 manifesto of the Revendication des Droits de la Femme was thus signed by the wives of militant cooperative members. The manifesto was also supported by Sophie Doctrinal, signing with Citoyenne Poirier (citizen Poirier), who would later become a close associate of Michel in the Paris Commune. In January 1870 Michel and Léo attended the funeral of Victor Noir. Michel expressed disappointment that the death of Noir had not been used to overthrow the Empire. At the start of the Siege of Paris, in November 1870, Léo in a lecture declared "It is not a question of our practicing politics, we are human, that is all."

Paris Commune

During the siege, Michel became part of the National Guard. When the Paris Commune was declared she was elected head of the Montmartre Women's Vigilance Committee. In April 1871 she threw herself into the armed struggle against the French government. She was the lover of Théophile Ferré, a senior member of the Commune and of its Committee of Public Safety. It was Ferré who ordered the execution of Georges Darboy, the Archbishop of Paris. She was aligned with Ferré and Raoul Rigault, two of the most militant  members of the Paris Commune. However, Ferré and Rigault persuaded her to not carry out her plan to assassinate Adolphe Thiers, the chief executive of the French national government. Instead Michel fought with the 61st Battalion of Montmartre during the Bloody Week, the battle that ended the Commune, and organised ambulance stations. In her memoirs she later wrote "oh, I'm a savage all right, I like the smell of gunpowder, grapeshot flying through the air, but above all, I'm devoted to the Revolution." On May 24, she surrendered to the French army in order to save her mother from imprisonment. 

Michel ideologically justified a militant revolution, proclaiming: "I descended the Butte, my rifle under my coat, shouting: Treason! . . . Our deaths would free Paris". She reflected: "It is true, perhaps, that women like rebellions. We are no better than men in respect to power, but power has not yet corrupted us." In her memoirs Michel confessed that the realities of the revolutionary government strengthened her resolve to end the discrimination against women. On the attitude of her male comrades, she wrote "How many times, during the Commune, did I go, with a national guardsman or a soldier, to some place where they hardly expected to have to contend with a woman?" She challenged her comrades to "play a part in the struggle for women's rights, after men and women have won the rights of all humanity?"

In December 1871, Michel was tried by a military court along with thousands of  prisoners captured during the Bloody Week. She was charged with offences including trying to overthrow the government, encouraging citizens to arm themselves, and herself using weapons and wearing a military uniform. Defiantly, she dared the judges to sentence her to death, saying "It seems that every heart that beats for freedom has no other right than a bit of lead, so I claim mine!" Michel was sentenced to penal transportation. It is estimated by some sources that 20,000 defenders of the Paris Commune had been summarily executed, though this number is highly disputed by other sources. Jacques Rougerie, a noted French Marxist historian, put the probable number at closer to 10,000. Michel was among the 1,169  supporters of the Commune who were sentenced to deportation.

Deportation

After twenty months in prison Michel was loaded onto the ship Virginie on 8 August 1873, to be deported to New Caledonia, where she arrived four months later. Whilst on board, she became acquainted with Henri Rochefort, a famous polemicist, who became her lifelong friend. She also met Nathalie Lemel, another figure active in the commune. It was this latter contact that led Louise to become an anarchist. She remained in New Caledonia for seven years and befriended the local Kanak people.

Taking an interest in Kanak legends, cosmology and languages, particularly the bichelamar creole, she learned about Kanak culture from friendships she had made with Kanak people. She taught French to the Kanaks and took their side in the 1878 Kanak revolt. The following year, she received authorisation to become a teacher in Nouméa for the children of the deported — among them many Algerian Kabyles ("Kabyles du Pacifique") from Cheikh Mokrani's rebellion (1871).

Return to France
In 1880, amnesty was granted to those who had participated in the Paris Commune. Michel returned to Paris, her revolutionary passion undiminished. She gave a public address on 21 November 1880 and continued her revolutionary activity in Europe, attending the anarchist congress in London in 1881, where she led demonstrations and spoke to huge crowds. While in London, she also attended meetings at the Russell Square home of the Pankhursts where she made a particular impression on a young Sylvia Pankhurst. In France she successfully campaigned, together with Charles Malato and Victor Henri Rochefort, for an amnesty to be also granted to Algerian deportees in New Caledonia.

In March 1883 Michel and Émile Pouget led a demonstration of unemployed workers. In a subsequent riot, 500 demonstrators led by Michel pillaged three bakeries and shouted "Bread, work, or lead". Reputedly, Michel led this demonstration with a black flag, which has since become a symbol of anarchism. It was the first recorded use of the anarchist black flag.

Michel was tried for her actions in the riot and used the court to publicly defend her anarchist principles. She was sentenced to six years of solitary confinement for inciting the looting. Michel was defiant. For her, the future of the human race was at stake, "one without exploiters and without exploited." Michel was released in 1886, at the same time as Kropotkin and other prominent anarchists.

Exile and speaking tours
In 1890 she was arrested again. After an attempt to commit her to a mental asylum she moved to London. Michel lived in London for five years. She opened a school and moved among the European anarchist exile circles. Her International Anarchist School for the children of political refugees opened in 1890 on Fitzroy Square. The teachings were influenced by the libertarian educationist Paul Robin and put into practice Mikhail Bakunin's educational principles, emphasising scientific and rational methods. Michel's aim was to develop among the children the principles of humanity and justice. Among the teachers were exiled anarchists, such as Victorine Rouchy-Brocher, but also pioneering educationalists such as Rachel McMillan and Agnes Henry. In 1892 the school was closed, when explosives were found in the basement. (See Walsall Anarchists.) It was later revealed that the explosives had been put there by Auguste Coulon, a Special Branch agent provocateur, who worked at the school as an assistant. Michel contributed to many English-speaking publications. Some of Michel's writings were translated into English by the poet Louisa Sarah Bevington. Michel's published works were also translated into Spanish by the anarchist Soledad Gustavo. The Spanish anarchist and workers rights activist Teresa Claramunt became known as the "Spanish Louise Michel".

By that time Michel had become a well-known speaker, touring Europe repeatedly to speak in front of thousands of people.
In 1895 Sébastien Faure and Michel founded the French anarchist periodical Le Libertaire (The Libertarian), now called Le Monde Libertaire (Libertarian World). In the same year Michel met Emma Goldman at an anarchist conference in London, at which both were speaking. The young Goldman was hugely impressed by Michel, considering her to have a "social instinct developed to the extreme". In reference to the harsh conditions of Michel's life, Goldman asserted "Anarchists insist that conditions must be radically wrong if human instincts develop to such extremes at the expense of each other."

Michel returned to France in 1895. In an 1896 article, entitled "Why I am an Anarchist", Michel argued that "Anarchy will not begin the eternal miseries anew. Humanity in its fight of despair will cling to it in order to emerge from the abyss." In 1904 Michel went on a conference tour through French Algeria. Michel was scheduled to meet the anti-colonial campaigner Isabelle Eberhardt, but Eberhardt died shortly before Michel arrived in Algeria.

Death 
Michel died of pneumonia in Marseille on 10 January 1905. Her funeral in Paris was attended by more than 100,000 people. Michel's grave is in the cemetery of Levallois-Perret, in one of the suburbs of Paris. The grave is maintained by the community. This cemetery is also the last resting place of her friend and fellow communard Théophile Ferré.

Political theory

Michel once joked, "We love to have agents provocateurs in the party, because they always propose the most revolutionary motions." Michel's political ideas evolved throughout her life. Once a teacher with progressive ideals, her activism saw her embrace revolutionary socialism, but the experience of a failed revolution turned her into a radical anarchist. Her political theory progressed from peaceful reform to violent revolution, because she came to believe that contemporary society had to be completely destroyed for a new egalitarian era to emerge. The many years she spent in prison and in the French penal colony New Caledonia were central to her change of heart.

Michel's political theory had its roots in the aftermath of the French Revolution, which was followed by a series of monarchies. Two prevailing theories emerged. There were those who believed that the Reign of Terror that followed the revolution was proof that democracy was flawed. The ruling elites of the post-revolutionary monarchies believed that for the economy to succeed, it was necessary to control the labour market, wages and working conditions. Thus few labour reforms were enacted. On the other hand, French romanticism reinterpreted the French Revolution as the tangible spirit of the French people. In the 1840s romanticism in France became politicised, because it became accepted that individual happiness could not be achieved in isolation. Romantics became preoccupied with social progress and reform. Writers embarked on a quest to realistically portray the lives of the working poor. Victor Hugo and Emile Zola emerged as key writers and political activists.

Shortly after Michel was born in 1830 a short-lived revolt resulted in a constitutional monarchy being established. Louis Philippe I encouraged commercial interests and the enrichment of the upper-middle class through colonization and penal transportation, but at the same time practiced laissez-faire when the socio-economic plight of the working class was concerned. Michel first made a name for herself by publicly defending the poor and working-class women. In the 1860s she was noted as political activist for vehemently opposing the policies of Emperor Napoleon III. Michel signed a number of her published political writings with Enjolras, the name of the revolutionary in Hugo's Les Misérables.

In 1865 she provocatively wrote a new Marseillaise, the call to arms during the French Revolution. In her Marseillaise, Michel called for a mass uprising of the people to defend the republic, arguing that martyrdom was preferable to defeat. This sentiment would be echoed in her subsequently published poetry, plays and novels. But unlike her contemporaries, Michel repeatedly lamented the violent treatment of children and the gory abuse of animals. Michel's political characters fought for justice, while the children and animals in her fictional works were too weak, sick and starved to resist or survive.

When Emperor Napoleon III and his army were captured by the Prussians in 1870, the French Third Republic was proclaimed in Paris. But the provisional government continued the war against the Prussians and a four-month siege of Paris resulted in bleak hardship. Parisians starved and froze to death. Some managed to save themselves by eating cats, dogs and rats. The government surrendered, but Michel and other Parisians had taken up arms and organised themselves as a National Guard. When the Paris Commune was proclaimed Michel was named head of the Women's Vigilance Committee and played a key role in initiating economic and social reforms. Michel pushed through the separation of church and state, initiated educational reforms and codified rights for workers. The reforms were not carried out  due to the short duration of the Commune. When Michel was tried, she demanded to be killed by firing squad and proclaimed "If you let me live, I shall never stop crying for vengeance, and I shall avenge my brothers by denouncing the murderers". The military court refused to make her a martyr.

Michel was imprisoned for two years before she was deported. While in prison she demanded to be treated just like the other prisoners and rejected efforts by her friends Hugo and Georges Clemenceau to have her sentence commuted. She considered preferential treatment a dishonour. During the four-month journey to New Caledonia Michel re-examined her belief in revolutionary socialism. She embraced anarchism and for the rest of her life rejected all forms of government. In 1896 she wrote about her change of mind:

"I considered the things, events and people of the past. I thought about the behaviour of our friends of the Commune: they were scrupulous, so afraid of exceeding their authority, that they never threw their full energies into anything but the loss of their own lives. I quickly came to the conclusion that good men in power are incompetent, just as bad men are evil, and therefore it is impossible for liberty ever to be associated with any form of power whatsoever."

Michel was introduced to the tenets of anarchism by a fellow prisoner Nathalie Lemel, with whom she was imprisoned in a large cage for several months. Michel became known for her selfless generosity and devotion to others. In the penal colony she lived in voluntary poverty, giving away her books, clothes and any money she acquired. Michel took up teaching again. She spent time with the indigenous Kanak people, teaching them French so that they could challenge the French authorities. Michel supported them in their revolt against the colonial power.

In 1875 the monarchist-dominated National Assembly passed a constitution that established a republican government with an upper and lower house of parliament. This republic was a compromise, as the National Assembly could not agree on who should be king. The brutal crackdown on the Paris Commune would influence French politics for years to come. Conservatives and moderates in the new government avoided anything that could trigger another uprising. This fear delayed the amnesty for those who had participated in the Paris Commune for years. Eventually an amnesty was granted and when Michel returned to Paris in November 1880 she was greeted by Henri Rochefort, Clemenceau, a crowd of 20,000 and the police. But she had no patience for Clemenceau's "illustration... that he should wait for parliamentarianism to bring progress".

Michel soon began her career as a public speaker and found an audience all over Europe. In 1882 she staged her first anarchist play Nadine. As a public speaker Michel became skilled in advancing pragmatic arguments to attack capitalism and the authoritarian state, while holding open the possibility of a positive outcome. When she was put on trial in 1883 for leading a group of unemployed workers, she attacked shortcomings in the implementation of the French republican constitution, saying:

"They keep talking to us about liberty: There is the liberty of speech with five years of prison at the end. In England, the meeting would have taken place; in France, they have not even made a legal admonition in order to let the crowd retreat, which would have left without resistance. People are dying from hunger, and they do not even have the right to say that they are dying from hunger."

Michel frequently spoke on women's rights from an anarchist perspective. She not only advocated education for women, but also that marriage should be free and that men should hold no property rights over women. In the late 1880s she authored several works in which she revisited the themes of her earlier works, but also portrayed the demise of the old order and its replacement with a society of equals. Michel embarked on a journey towards a new political philosophy. The revolutionary characters in The Strike expected to die, but instead they gave life to a new age and Michel discussed the rights and responsibilities of the people who lived in the aftermath of a revolution.

She staged her plays in accordance with Jean Grave's theory on audience participation. The audience was integrated through a political and artistic program of lectures, poems and songs. The audience was encouraged to react and re-enact the conflicts of the plays. In her plays The Human Microbes (1886), Crimes of the Times (1888) and The Bordello (1890) an agricultural utopia emerges from a devastated Europe. Michel's political ideals owed much to the French romanticism of Hugo and are described at length in The New Era, Last Thought, Memories of Caledonia (1887):

"It is indeed time that this old world die since no one is safe any longer... We can no longer live like our Stone Age ancestors, nor as in the past century, since the series of inventions, since the discoveries of science have brought the certainty that all production will increase a hundredfold when these innovations will be used for the general good, instead of letting just a handful of vultures help themselves in order to starve the rest."

Michel lived at a time when hunger was widespread among the working poor of Europe. She believed that technological progress would replace physical labour with machines. In combination with anarchist politics, she argued, this could lead to equal distribution of wealth. In 1890 she reasoned that "the attractive power of progress will demonstrate itself all the more as daily bread will be assured, and a few hours of work which will have become attractive and voluntary will be enough to produce more than what is necessary for consumption." Like other anarchists of her time she did not believe that history was a record of constant improvement, but that it could become so. However, constant economic growth was not an improvement in itself. Michel argued instead, that progress came through intellectual development, social evolution and liberation. Her vision of the future was shaped by a supreme confidence.

"Science will bring forth harvests in the desert; the energy of the tempests and whirlpools will carve paths through the mountains. Undersea boats will discover lost continents. Electricity will carry ships of the air above the icy poles. The ideas of Liberty, Equality and Justice will finally burst into flame. Each individual will live his integral part within humankind as a whole. Progress being infinite, transformations will be perpetual."

Michel did not only bemoan the poverty in which people across Europe lived, she also advanced a detailed critique of 19th century capitalism. She lamented the deficiencies of the capitalist banking system and predicted that the concentration of capital would result in the ruin of small enterprises and the middle class. In her memoirs Michel said that the Anarchist Manifesto of Lyon (1883) precisely expressed her views. The Manifesto had been signed by Peter Kropotkin, Émile Gautier, Joseph Bernard,  and Toussaint Bordat. Kropotkin, like Jules Guesde and Émile Pouget would become close friends and associates of her. Instead of focusing on violent revolution, as she had done in her earlier works, Michel in her later works emphasised the spontaneous uprising of the people. She came to reject terror as a means of bringing about a new era. She wrote "Tyrannicide is practical only when tyranny has a single head, or at most a small number of heads. When it is a hydra, only the Revolution can kill it". She took the view that it is best if the leaders of such a revolution would perish, so that the people would not be burdened with surviving general staff. Michel thought that "power is evil" and in her mind history was the story of free people being enslaved. In an 1882 speech she said "All revolutions have been insufficient because they have been political". Organisation was, in her mind, not necessary because the poor and exploited would rise up and, through their sheer numbers, would force the old order to shrivel up.

Legacy

Michel was among the more influential French political figures in the second half of the 19th century. She was also one of the more powerful women political theorists of her day. Her publications on social justice for the poor and the cause of the working classes were read in France and all over Europe. When she died in 1905 she was mourned by thousands. Memorial services were held all over France and in London. Although her writings are today forgotten, her name is remembered in the names of French streets, schools and parks. Michel became a national heroine in France and was revered as the "great citizen". A cultish image of Michel emerged.

Shortly before her death, when returning from her exile in London, Michel had been dubbed "the angel of petrol", "the virago of the rabble" and "queen of the scum" by the conservative French press. In turn, Charles Ferdinand Gambon compared her to Jeanne d'Arc in reference to her role in the Paris Commune. This imagery was further propagandized by Edmond Lepelletier in 1911. The image of Michel as vierge rouge (red virgin) came to be used by conservative and liberal historians alike when recounting the story of the Paris Commune.

Michel is regarded as a founder of anarcha-feminism. Despite the anti-authoritarian rhetoric, early anarchist thinkers maintained cultural orthodoxy when it came to the division of domestic labour and their personal relationships with women. The founder of French anarchism, Pierre-Joseph Proudhon was notorious for his sexist views. Michel, Teresa Claramunt, Lucy Parsons, Voltairine de Cleyre and Emma Goldman became prominent figures in the late 19th century pan-European and American anarchist movement. With the formation of the First International anarchist sections in various European countries under the leadership of Mikhail Bakunin, anarchism became noted for not only encouraging female participation in the political movement, but also for espousing the ideal of female emancipation.

Michel was rediscovered by French feminists in the 1970s through the works of Xavière Gauthier.

Academic interest in Michel's life and political writings was prompted in the 1970s by Édith Thomas's comprehensively researched biography.

Louise Michel station on the Paris Metro, located in Levallois-Perret, is named for her.

Michel is the subject of Mary M Talbot and Bryan Talbot's graphic work, The Red Virgin and the Vision of Utopia (2016).

In 2020, street artist Banksy was credited for sending a rescue ship in the Mediterranean Sea and naming it after Michel.

Publications
 À travers la vie, poetry, Paris, 1894.
 Le Bâtard impérial, by L. Michel and J. Winter, Paris, 1883.
 Le claque-dents, Paris.
 La Commune, Paris, 1898.
 ''Contes et légendes'', Paris, 1884. Translated into English by Jade Maître as 'Fairy Tales and Legends'
 Les Crimes de l'époque, nouvelles inédites, Paris, 1888.
 Défense de Louise Michel, Bordeaux, 1883.
 L'Ère nouvelle, pensée dernière, souvenirs de Calédonie (prisoners' songs), Paris, 1887
 La Fille du peuple par L. Michel et A. Grippa, Paris (1883)
 Le Gars Yvon, légende bretonne, Paris, 1882.
 Légendes et Chants des Gestes Canaques', Paris, 1885. Translated into English by Mitch Abidor as 'Legends and Chants des Gestes' 2005.
 Lectures encyclopédiques par cycles attractifs, Paris, 1888.
 Ligue internationale des femmes révolutionnaires, Appel à une réunion. Signed "Louise Michel", Paris, 1882.
 Le livre du jour de l'an : historiettes, contes et légendes pour les enfants, Paris, 1872.
 Lueurs dans l'ombre. Plus d'idiots, plus de fous. L'âme intelligente. L'idée libre. L'esprit lucide de la terre à Dieu... Paris, 1861.
 Manifeste et proclamation de Louise Michel aux citoyennes de Paris, Signed "Louise Maboul", Paris, 1883.
 Mémoires, Paris, 1886 (edited and translated by Bullitt Lowry and Elizabeth Ellington Gunter as The Red Virgin : Memoirs of Louise Michel, The University of Alabama Press University, 1981)
 Les Méprises, grand roman de mœurs parisiennes, par Louise Michel et Jean Guêtré, Paris, 1882.
 Les Microbes humains, Paris, 1886. (translated by Brian Stableford as The Human Microbes)
 La Misère by Louise Michel, 2nd part, and Jean Guêtré 1st part, Paris, 1882.
 Le Monde nouveau, Paris, 1888 (translated by Brian Stableford as The New World)
 "Nous reviendrons foule sans nombre": Louise Michel à Victor Hugo, lettres de prison et du bagne (1871–1879), ed. by Virginie Berling, coll. Scènes intempestives à Grignan, ed. TriArtis, Paris 2016, .

Posthumous
 Vol. I. Avant la Commune. Preface by Laurent Tailhade, Alfortville, 1905.
 Les Paysans by Louise Michel et Émile Gautier, Paris, Incomplete.
 Prise de possession, Saint-Denis, 1890.
 Le Rêve (in a work by Constant Martin), Paris, 1898.
 '', edition established by Xavière Gauthier, Édition de Paris-Max Chaleil, 1999.

See also 
Anarchism in France
Louise Michel Battalions – Spanish Civil War

References

Bibliography

 
 
 
 
 
 
 
 
 
 
 
 
 
 
 
 
 
 
 
 

 <

External links

Louise Michel archive at the Anarchy Archives
 Paul Foot on Louise Michel
 Archive of Louise Michel Papers at the International Institute of Social History

1830 births
1905 deaths
Anarcha-feminists
Burials at Levallois-Perret Cemetery
Communards
French anarchists
French anti-capitalists
French feminists
French socialists
French women activists
French women environmentalists
People from Haute-Marne
People of Montmartre
French socialist feminists
Women in 19th-century warfare
Women in war in France
19th-century French women politicians